FUA or Fua may refer to:

People
 Alani Fua (born 1992), American football player
 Fua Haripitak (1910–1993), Thai artist
 Sione Fua (born 1988), American football player
 Fua (footballer) (born 1969), Angolan footballer

Other uses
 Al-Fu'ah, a town in Syria
 Argentine University Federation
 Federal Union Army, a military coalition of insurgent groups in Myanmar (Burma)
 Force Unit Access (computing), an I/O write command option
 El Fua, an Internet meme
 Futura International Airways (ICAO code), a defunct Spanish airline
 Functional urban area, a measure of the population and expanse of metropolitan areas in countries